The 1971 Campeonato Nacional was Primera División de Chile’s 39th season since its foundation in 1933. Unión San Felipe was the tournament's champion, winning its first ever league title at top-level. By doing this, San Felipe became the only Chilean team to win the second division one year, and the first division tournament the next year.

Standings

Results

Relegation play-off

Top goalscorers

References

Bibliography

External links
ANFP 

Primera División de Chile seasons
Prim
Chile